Adibhatla Kailasam was an Indian communist leader. Kailasam was one of the original leaders of the Srikakulam peasant uprising. Kailasam came from a landlord family of Kaarivalasa village in Srikakulam, Andhra Pradesh. He joined the Communist Party of India (Marxist-Leninist) and he was elected to its central committee at the party congress in 1970.

Kailasam was a school teacher by profession. In the early 1960s, Kailasam and his colleague Satyanarayan, began to organise tribal peasants in the Srikakulam area. State authorities began to register criminal cases against the two, and they decided to go into hiding. On 7 July 1970, Kailasam and Satyanarayan were captured by police. They were later shot dead around 10–11 July.

References

Indian communists
Telugu politicians
1970 deaths
Year of birth missing
People from Srikakulam district
People from Uttarandhra
Communist Party of India (Marxist–Leninist) politicians
People shot dead by law enforcement officers in India